Michel Diefenbacher (15 July 1947, in Sarrebourg – 9 October 2017) was a French politician and member of the National Assembly of France. He represented the Lot-et-Garonne department,  and was a member of the Union for a Popular Movement.

References

1947 births
2017 deaths
People from Sarrebourg
Union for a Popular Movement politicians
Prefects of France
Prefects of Guadeloupe
Deputies of the 12th National Assembly of the French Fifth Republic
Deputies of the 13th National Assembly of the French Fifth Republic